"Too Good To Be Forgotten" is a song originally by The Chi-Lites in 1974 reaching no. 10 in the UK Singles chart. However it was a bigger hit for Amazulu in 1986 on their album Amazulu. It reached no. 5 on the UK Singles chart, making it their highest charting and only top 10 single on that chart. The song has also been covered by John Holt.

Track listing

7" Single 

A - Too Good To Be Forgotten - 3:00

B - Sez Who - 4:06

12" Single 

A - Too Good To Be Forgotten - 5:32

B - Sez Who - 7:46

2 X 12" Single (Limited Edition) 

A - Too Good To Be Forgotten - 5:32

B - Sez Who - 7:46

C - Hit Mix - 6:04 (Mixed By Dakeyne)

D - Hit Mix - 6:04 (Mixed By Dakeyne)

Charts

The Chi-Lites version

Amazulu version

External links
 Video on YouTube
 Page on Discogs

1974 singles
1986 singles
Tropical songs
World music songs
American pop songs
Songs written by Barbara Acklin
Songs written by Eugene Record
Year of song missing
Island Records singles
1974 songs
The Chi-Lites songs